Christmas Present is the second Christmas album and eleventh studio album by jazz saxophonist Boney James, released in 2007.

Track listing

Personnel 
 Boney James – arrangements (1, 2, 3, 5-10), soprano saxophone (1, 4, 8), keyboards (2, 5, 8, 10), tenor saxophone (2, 3, 5, 6, 7, 9, 10)
 Phil Davis – keyboards (1), arrangements (1, 3), Rhodes piano (3)
 Darrell Smith – keyboards (2), arrangements (2)
 Eric Daniels – additional Rhodes piano (3), keyboards (6, 7), arrangements (6, 7), Rhodes piano (8)
 Tim Carmon – clavinet (3), organ (3), acoustic piano (4), keyboards (4, 5, 9), arrangements (5, 9)
 Paul Jackson Jr. – acoustic guitar (3), guitar solo (3), guitars (5)
 Tony Maiden – electric guitar (3), guitars (6)
 Dean Parks – guitars (7), acoustic guitar (8, 10)
 Alex Al – bass (1-6, 8, 10)
 Dave Weckl – drums (1), brushes (8)
 Teddy Campbell – drums (3, 5-8, 10)
 Lenny Castro – percussion
 Rick Braun – flugelhorn (5)
 Chanté Moore – vocals (2)
 Angie Stone – vocals (6)
 Anthony Hamilton – vocals (9)

References

External links
 AllMusic review

2007 Christmas albums
Concord Records albums
Boney James albums
Christmas albums by American artists
Jazz Christmas albums